Lincoln Place may refer to:
 Lincoln Place (Granite City), Illinois, United States
 Lincoln Place (Pittsburgh), Pennsylvania, United States
 Lincoln Place Apartment Homes, Los Angeles, California, United States
Lincoln Place, Dublin, Ireland